The White House COVID-19 Response Team is the task force during the presidency of Joe Biden to respond to the COVID-19 pandemic in the United States. It was set up by Joe Biden on his first day in officeJanuary 20, 2021and replaced President Trump's White House Coronavirus Task Force and Joe Biden's transitionary COVID-19 Advisory Board.

The task force was established by Executive Order 13987.

Members

Former members

References

National responses to the COVID-19 pandemic
Organizations established for the COVID-19 pandemic
COVID-19 pandemic in the United States
Task forces
United States Presidential Task Forces
U.S. federal government response to the COVID-19 pandemic
Presidency of Joe Biden
2021 establishments in the United States